HMS Medway (Pennant F25) was the first purpose-built submarine depot ship constructed for the Royal Navy. She was built by Vickers Armstrong at Barrow-in-Furness during the late 1920s. The ship served on the China Station before the Second World War and was transferred to Egypt in early 1940. Ordered to evacuate Alexandria in the face of the German advance after the Battle of Gazala in May 1942, Medway sailed for Lebanon at the end of June, escorted by a light cruiser and seven destroyers. Her strong escort could not protect her; on 30 June a German submarine torpedoed and sank her.

Description and construction
Medway was designed to support up to 18  and s in peacetime and an additional three submarines during wartime. She carried three QF 4-inch Mk IV deck guns as spares together with 144  torpedoes to resupply her submarines.

Her crew numbered 400 officers and ratings; she could also accommodate up to 1,335 additional men.

Medway carried  of diesel fuel for herself and an additional  for her submarines. Figures for her range are not available. The ship had five  diesel generators for electrical power and special provisions to recharge submarine batteries.

She was armed with two low-angle  guns in single mounts and four quick-firing Mk V 4-inch anti-aircraft guns, also in single mounts. The latter guns were controlled by a High-Angle Control System mounted above the bridge. Amidships a  torpedo bulkhead was located 13 feet inboard that inclined outwards above the waterline. The main deck was 1.5 inches thick amidships.

Medway was ordered on 14 September 1926 as part of the 1925/26 Naval Estimates. The ship was laid down in April 1927 by the Vickers Armstrong shipyard in Barrow-in-Furness.  The ship was launched on 19 July 1928. Captain Colin Cantlie was appointed as the first commander of the new ship on 1 January 1929. The ship was completed on 3 July 1929.

After completion, HMS Medway began Harbour Acceptance Trials and Sea Acceptance Trials, known in the Royal Navy as HATs and SATs. A report in The Singapore Free Press and Mercantile Advertiser on 27 July 1929 notes that HMS Medway was undergoing trials.

Career
HMS Medway served on the China Station before the start of the Second World War. She had taken over from HMS Titania in 1929/30 as the submarine depot ship for the 4th Submarine Flotilla. HMS Medway took her place in Hong Kong as the depot ship for the 4th Submarine Flotilla. Under the command of Capt. Colin Cantlie HMS Medway sailed to Hong Kong with six O-Class submarines of the Odin group. They were:

 HMS Odin (N84)
 HMS Olympus (N35)
 HMS Osiris (N67)
 HMS Orpheus (N46)
 HMS Oswald (N58)
 HMS Otus (N92)

The submarine flotilla was enlarged in 1930.

HMS Medway was under refit at Singapore from September 1939 through February 1940. Upon completion of the refit, Medway sailed for Hong Kong where she remained until she departed for Alexandria on 2 April. She arrived there on 3 May and thereafter supported the 1st Submarine Flotilla, which operated in the Eastern Mediterranean.

Two years later, Vice-Admiral Henry Harwood, Commander-in-Chief, Mediterranean Fleet, ordered all non-essential ships to leave Alexandria in June 1942 as he was preparing to demolish the port facilities there to prevent their capture by the advancing Panzer Army Africa. Medway loaded stores and 1,135 personnel on 29 June to establish a new base at Beirut, Lebanon and sailed later that day for Beirut. The next day, off Port Said,  fired two torpedoes that sank Medway; 30 men were lost in the sinking. 47 of the 90 spare torpedoes aboard floated free of the wreck and were salvaged.

See also 
 Submarine depot ships
 HMS Ambrose (1903)
 HMS Hazard (1894)
 HMS Cyclops (F31)
 HMS Titania (1915)

Notes

References

External links
Submarine Heritage entry
Uboat.net entry

 

Auxiliary ships of the Royal Navy
Royal Navy Submarine Depot Ships
Fleet auxiliaries of the United Kingdom
World War II naval ships of the United Kingdom
Ships built in Barrow-in-Furness
1928 ships
World War II shipwrecks in the Mediterranean Sea
Maritime incidents in June 1942
Ships sunk by German submarines in World War II